McGorry is a surname. Notable people with the surname include:

Brian McGorry (born 1970), English footballer
Matt McGorry (born 1986), American actor and activist
Patrick McGorry (born 1952), Australian psychiatrist

See also
Gorry
McGarry
McGrory